Still Here may refer to:

Music

Albums
 Still Here (The Beasts album), 2019
 Still Here (John Mark Nelson album) 2011
 Still Here, by Ian Thomas Band, 1978
 Still Here, by Gæleri, 1999
 Still Here, by the Temptations, 2010
 Still Here, by the Williams Brothers, 2003
 Still Here, an EP by Iann Dior, 2021
 Still Here, by KR$NA, 2021
 Still, Here, 2022 album by Marisa Anderson

Songs
 "Still Here", by Drake from Views, 2016
 "Still Here", by Natasha Bedingfield from N.B., 2008
 "Still Here!", by Oh Land from Fauna, 2008
 "Still Here", by Snoop Dogg from Neva Left, 2017
 "Still Here", by Westlife from The Love Album, 2006

Other uses 
 Still Here (film), a 2020 American crime drama film by Vlad Feier
 Still/Here, a 1994 documentary film by Bill T. Jones
 Still Here, a 2002 novel by Linda Grant
 Still Here, a New York fashion brand